H. Diane Snyder is a former a Republican member of the New Mexico Senate, serving District 15 in Albuquerque. She was first elected in 2000 and re-elected in 2004, but lost her seat in 2008.

References

Year of birth missing (living people)
Living people
Politicians from Albuquerque, New Mexico
Republican Party New Mexico state senators